This is a list of ships of the Confederate States Navy (CSN), used by the Confederate States of America during the American Civil War between 1861 and 1865. Included are some types of civilian vessels, such as blockade runners, steamboats, and privateers which contributed to the war efforts by the CSN. Also included are special types of floating batteries and harbor defense craft.

CSN Warships
The Secretary of the CS Navy, Stephen Mallory, was very aggressive on a limited budget in a land-focused war, and developed a two-pronged warship strategy of building ironclad warships for coastal and national defense, and commerce raiding cruisers, supplemented with exploratory use of special weapons such as torpedo boats and torpedoes.

Batteries
Based upon the successful employment of ironclad warships, particularly batteries, at the Battle of Kinburn, Britain and France decided to focus on armor plated warships, starting with coastal battery designs. Initial ocean going ironclad cruisers, such as the French  and the British  were only just emerging in 1859 and 1860, and were beyond the budget and timeline necessary for rapid force deployment that the CS Navy needed for immediate coastal defenses in 1861.

Therefore, the Confederate Congress voted $2 million in May 1861 to buy ironclads from overseas, and in July and August started work on construction and converting wooden ships locally. On 12 October 1861, the  became the first ironclad to enter battle when she fought Union warships on the Mississippi. In February 1862, the even larger  joined the Confederate Navy, having been built at Norfolk. The Confederacy built a number of ships designed as versions of the Virginia, of which several saw action. In the failed attack on Charleston on April 7, 1863 two small ironclads,  and  participated in the successful defense of the harbor.

Ironclad steam powered batteries

The CS Navy ironclad steamer batteries were all designed for national coastal defense.

, twin-screw steamer, ironclad ram, sunk: October 28, 1864
, twin-screw steamer, ironclad ram, destroyed: August 5, 1862
, triple-screw steamer, ironclad ram, captured: June 17, 1863
, side-wheel steamer, cotton-clad and ironclad ram, surrendered: May 10, 1865
, ironclad steam sloop, destroyed: February 18, 1865
, steamer, ironclad ram, destroyed: February 18, 1865
, single screw steamer, ironclad ram, captured: April 26, 1865
, side-wheel steamer, ironclad gunboat, captured incomplete: February 8, 1862
, twin-screw steamer, ironclad ram, destroyed: April 4, 1865
, ironclad steam floating battery, scuttled: April 12, 1865
, twin screw and double center-wheel steamer, ironclad, destroyed: April 28, 1862
, screw steamer, ironclad ram, sunk: April 24, 1862
, steamer, ironclad, burned incomplete: December 21, 1864
, triple-screw steamer, ironclad, burned: April 25, 1862
, center-wheel steam sloop, ironclad ram, surrendered: June 3, 1865
, screw steamer, ironclad, burned before launching: May 21, 1863
, twin-screw with center-wheel steamer, ironclad, burned: April 17, 1865
, side-wheel steamer, ironclad ram, surrendered: May 10, 1865
, twin-screw steam sloop, ironclad ram, destroyed: March 14, 1865
, steam sloop, ironclad, accidentally sank: September 27, 1864
, sloop, ironclad ram, destroyed: 18 February 1865
, steam sloop, ironclad, wrecked: May 7, 1864
, screw steamer, ironclad ram, scuttled: April 3, 1865
, steam sloop, ironclad, burned: December 21, 1864
, twin-screw steamer, ironclad ram, destroyed before launching: June 5, 1862
, single screw steamer, ironclad ram, captured: August 5, 1864
, twin-screw steamer, ironclad ram, never completed, captured: April 4, 1865
, ironclad steam floating battery, scuttled: April 12, 1865
, screw steamer, ironclad ram, destroyed: May 11, 1862
, steam sloop, ironclad, destroyed: April 4, 1865
, twin-screw steamer, ironclad gunboat, destroyed before completion: January 1865

Ironclad floating batteries
CS Navy ironclad floating batteries lacked steam engines for propulsion and were towed into firing positions.

, ironclad floating battery, scuttled: 24 December 1864
, ironclad floating battery, scuttled: December 21, 1864
, ironclad floating battery, destroyed: 1865

Wooden floating batteries

CS Navy wooden floating batteries were towed into firing positions, and as in the case at Charleston Harbor, used for makeshift defense.

, floating battery
, floating battery
, floating battery, scuttled: April 7, 1862
Floating Battery of Charleston Harbor

Cruisers
CS Navy cruisers were ocean-going ships designed primarily for the Confederate Navy's strategy of guerre de course. Confederate States Navy cruisers were typically lightly armed, with a couple of large guns or a pivot gun, and often very fast. The Navy planned to add ironclad cruisers to their fleet, successfully procuring one, but too late to be of benefit for the war.

Wooden cruisers
, screw steamer, sloop-of-war, built in Birkenhead, England by John Laird Sons and Company, sunk: June 19, 1864
, screw steamer, bark-rigged, built in Liverpool, England, seized before delivery: April 5, 1863
CSS America, racing yacht, scuttled: 1862
, schooner, captured: June 28, 1863
, revenue cutter, burned: June 28, 1863
, screw steamer, burned
, brig, burned: June 12, 1863
, screw steamer, sloop, captured: October 7, 1864
, screw steamer, iron, sold: June 1, 1864
, steamer, destroyed: After leaving port on March 20, 1863 the steamer is destroyed on March 22, 1863
, bark, burned: June 20, 1863
, side-wheel steamer, brig rigged, sold and used as privateer Rattlesnake and sunk, February 28, 1862
, screw steamer, sloop-of-war, turned over at war's end
, screw steamer, full rigged, iron-framed, turned over to British Government
, screw steamer, sloop, sold: December 19, 1862
, bark, burned: June 25, 1863
, twin-screw steamer, sloop, seized: April 9, 1865 by British Government
, bark, seized: December 29, 1863
CSS United States, frigate, sail, harbor defense use only, scuttled

Ironclad cruisers
But the CS Navy attempts to procure ironclad cruisers from overseas were frustrated as European nations confiscated ships being built for the Confederacy. Only the Stonewall was completed and successfully delivered, and she arrived in American waters just in time for the end of the war.

CSS North Carolina I, seized October 1863 and commissioned as 
CSS Mississippi II, seized October 1863 and commissioned as 
, twin-screw steamer, brig rigged, ironclad, surrendered in Cuba at end of war, returned to US, sold to Japan and renamed 
CSS Cheops, sister to Stonewall, built in France and sold to Prussia, October 29, 1865, and named 
CSS Georgia screw corvette 2017 tons [1,150 tons BOM]. Sold to Peru after the French government stopped its sale to the Confederacy. Taken into service as BAP Unión 1864. Scuttled January 1881 to avoid capture.
CSS Texas, screw corvette and sister ship of BAP Union. Sold to Peru after the French government stopped its sale to the Confederacy. Taken into service as BAP America. Lost during the Arica tsunami on 13 August 1868.
Ironclad Frigate No. 61, arranged by Captain James H. North, CSN, sold to Denmark, commissioned as

Gunboats

, dispatch boat, run aground 1 November 1862; seized and placed in service by the Union
, side-wheel steamer, burned or captured April 1862
, tugboat, burned February 10, 1862
, schooner
, surrendered to U.S. Navy 1865; sold 1866
, screw steamer, captured by U.S. Navy April 3, 1865
, side-wheel steamer, destroyed incomplete April 1862
, schooner, burned February 10, 1862
, steamer, captured: May 5, 1864
CSS Calhoun, sidewheel gunboat, captured: January 23, 1862
, sidewheel steamer, destroyed April 1862
, twin-screw steamer, scuttled: December, 1864
CSS Clifton, side-wheel gunboat, Texas Marine Department, scuttled March 1864
, side-wheel river steamer, sunk: February 7, 1862
CSS De Soto, side-wheel steamer, captured: September 30, 1862
, river steamer, destroyed: April 28, 1862
, steamer, which twice changed hands, managed to survive the Civil War and was presumably decommissioned
, steamer, tender, destroyed: January 24, 1865
, steamer, tugboat, captured: February 10, 1862
, steamer, burned: 1865
, screw steamer, iron hull, burned: February 10, 1862
, schooner
, steamer, tugboat, burned: February 10, 1862

, side-wheel steamer
, steamer, destroyed: April 24, 1862
, steamer, destroyed: June 26, 1862
, side-wheel river steamer, burned
CSS Germantown sloop-of-war, sunk as blockship May 10, 1862
, side-wheel steamer, schooner rigged, destroyed: April 23, 1862. Also listed as a Cotton Clad ram (see below) since she had cotton as part of her armor.
, screw steamer, burned: April 4, 1865
, steamer, tug
, side-wheel steamer; Charleston harbor gunboat: sank March 10, 1864
, cutter, schooner rigged
, side-wheel steamer
, steamer, burned: December 21, 1864
, side-wheel river steamer, burned: 1863
, a side-wheel river steamer, burned: January 14, 1863 (See Bayou Teche and ). Sometimes called an ironclad since she had a small amount of railroad iron tacked onto her side.
, side-wheel river steamer, tug, sunk
, side-wheel steamer, sunk: May, 1862
, steamer, tug, dismantled: 1862
, schooner, scuttled
, steamer tug, iron, machinery mounted in CSS Palmetto
, steamer, captured: April, 1862
, steamer, destroyed: April 24, 1862
, side-wheel steamer, destroyed: June 26, 1862
, steamer
, bark
, side-wheel steamer, sunk: June, 1862
, screw steamer, sloop rigged, sunk: April 28, 1862
, side-wheel steamer, surrender: 1865
, cutter
, sail, burned: January 23, 1863
, twin-screw gunboat, burned: April 3, 1865
, steamer, sunk: January 1, 1863
, steamer
, steamer, scuttled: Apr, 1862
, side-wheel river steamer, burned: 1862
, side-wheel steamer, CSNA school ship, burned: April 4, 1865
, screw steamer, sunk: 1865
, sloop-of-war, burned: 1862
, side-wheel river steamer, burned
, side-wheel river steamer, burned: 1863
, steamer
, formerly St. Nicholas until seized and purchased in 1861, side-wheel steamer, burned: April, 1862
, cutter, schooner rigged
, burned: April 24, 1862
, screw steamer, destroyed: April 4, 1865

, side-wheel river steamer
, steamer, foundered: August 18, 1863
, formerly A.H. Schultz, until seized and purchased in 1861, side-wheel steamer, used as a flag of truce vessel, sunk: February 17, 1865
, side-wheel river steamer, sunk: February 10, 1862
, side-wheel river steamer, captured: August 5, 1864
, steam tug, sunk
, side-wheel river steamer, burned
, burned: 1865
, side-wheel steamer, sunk: 1863
, tug, captured: 1862

, screw steamer, tug/tender, iron, burned: April 4, 1865

, side-wheel steamer, burned

, schooner
, side-wheel steamer, burned: December 19, 1864
, side-wheel river steamer, wrecked
, steamer, burned: 1865

Torpedo boats

, semi-submersible torpedo boat
, larger version of David, captured incomplete: February, 1865
CSS Gunnison, screw steam spar torpedo boat
, spar torpedo boat
, steam torpedo boat
, steam torpedo boat, captured: February, 1865
, spar torpedo boat
, spar torpedo boat

CSS St. Patrick, semi-submersible torpedo boat or submarine
, screw steamer spar torpedo boat
, spar torpedo boat

CSN Support ships

Government blockade runners

, side-wheel steamer, captured: September 10, 1864
, screw steamer
, side-wheel steamer, captured

CSS Lady Stirling, side-wheel steamer, captured: October 28, 1864

CSS William G. Hewes, (later SS Ella and Annie), captured: November 9, 1863

, side-wheel steamer

Government steamers
, side-wheel river steamer, captured: April 7, 1862

, screw steamer, burned: February 10, 1862

, side-wheel coastal steamer, captured: December, 1864
, side-wheel river steamer burned: June 28, 1862
, side-wheel river steamer, captured: April 7, 1862

, stern-wheel river steamer, scuttled: April 7, 1862

CSS Ida, side-wheel coastal steamer, captured/burned: December 10, 1864

, 1861
, side-wheel river steamer, captured: April 7, 1862

, side-wheel river steamer, sunk: April 7, 1862
, 1861
, side-wheel river steamer, captured: April 7, 1862

, side-wheel steamer, captured: January, 1862
, side-wheel river steamer, captured: April 7, 1862

Government transports

CSS City of Vicksburg, side-wheel steamer transport, damaged when rammed on February 3, 1863 then destroyed: February/March 1863

CSS Darlington
, side-wheel river steamer, captured: April 7, 1862
, side-wheel steamer, captured by its slave pilot Robert Smalls, May 13, 1862

, side-wheel river steamer, sunk: April 7, 1862

Cutters
, revenue cutter, schooner rigged
, revenue cutter, schooner rigged
, revenue cutter, schooner rigged, dismantled
, revenue cutter, schooner rigged

Hospital ships
, stern-wheel river steamer, burned: April 7, 1862

Tenders and tugs

, lighthouse tender, schooner rigged
, tugboat
, side-wheel steamer tender, burned
, side-wheel steamer tender, burned: December 21, 1864
, receiving ship, burned
, side-wheel steamer, tugboat, captured: December 12, 1864
, steam tugboat, sold: March 8, 1863
CSS Satellite, sidewheel steamer, gunboat/tugboat, destroyed: August, 1863
, tender, burned: April 4, 1865
CSS St. Philip, receiving ship, sunk
, steam tugboat, machinery mounted into CSS North Carolina II (renamed "Retribution" and "Etta")

Civilian auxiliary

Privateers
, privateer steam tug
, privateer cutter, schooner rigged, captured: November 12, 1861
Bonita, 8-gun, 1,110-ton privateer steamer
Boston, 5-gun privateer steamer operating out of Mobile burned captured barques Lenex and Texana
Charlotte Clark, 3-gun, 1,110-ton privateer steamer
Chesapeake, 4-gun, 60-ton privateer schooner
, privateer schooner, captured on April 15, 1862, but had itself captured the USA Schooner Mary Alice on July 25, 1861, the USA Barque Glenn on July 31 of 1861.
Dove, 8-gun, 1,170-ton privateer steamer
Gallatin, 150-ton privateer schooner with 2 × 12-pdr
General N.S. Reneau, privateer steamer
, privateer schooner
, privateer, which captured the USA Brigandine William McGilvery on July 25, 1861, the USA Schooner Protector on July 28, 1861.
, privateer steamer, captured: May 11, 1862
Hallie Jackson, privateer brig captured by USS Union
, privateer screw steamer
, privateer side-wheel steamer, which captured the Barque Ocean Eagle on May 16, 1861, the ship Milan in May, 1861, the Schooner Etta in May, 1861, the Brigandine Panama on May 29, 1861, the Schooner Mermaid on May 24, 1861 and the Schooner John Adams on May 24, 1861, all within its first month of operation in 1861, and which was burned: 1862
J. M. Chapman, privateer schooner, captured: March 15, 1863
, privateer schooner
, privateer brig, ran aground: mid-August, 1861
Joseph Landis, 400-ton privateer steamer
Josephine, privateer schooner
, privateer schooner, destroyed: September 14, 1861
Lamar, privateer schooner
, privateer schooner
, privateer screw steamer, which captured the US schooner Nathaniel Chase on July 25, 1861.
Mocking Bird, 8-gun, 1,290-ton privateer steamer operating out of New Orleans
, privateer steamer
Onward, 70-ton privateer schooner with 1 × 32-pdr
Paul Jones, 2-gun, 160-ton privateer schooner
Pelican, 10-gun, 1,479-ton privateer steamer
, privateer, went to sea on July 1, 1861 and sunk on July 28, 1861 by the Union Navy frigate .
Phenix, 7-gun, 1,644-ton privateer steamer
, privateer schooner
, privateer schooner, captured: June 3, 1861
, privateer brig
, privateer side-wheel steamer
Triton, 30-ton privateer schooner with 1 × 6-pdr
, privateer steamer
, privateer pilot boat, schooner rigged, which was burned on August 9, 1861, after capturing the US brigandine B.T. Martin about July 28, 1861 and the schooner George G. Baker on August 9, 1861, on the day of its demise, whereafter the Union quickly recaptured the George G. Baker.

Privateer submersible torpedo boats
, hand-cranked, sunk: February 17, 1864. Named in honor of its designer, Confederate marine engineer Horace Lawson Hunley.

, also known as Pioneer II
Bayou Saint John

Civilian steamers
, captured: May 7, 1861
, captured: May 7, 1861
, of Savannah

Civilian transports
Berwick Bay, steamer, captured February 3, 1863
O.W. Baker, steamer, captured February 3, 1863
Moro, steamer, captured February 3, 1863
Era No. 5, shallow-draft steamer, captured: February 14, 1863

Civilian blockade runners

, side-wheel steamer
Agnes E. Fry, paddle steamer
Alabama, schooner
, schooner
Annie Dees, steamer, sloop-rigged
, schooner
, side-wheel steamer
Bat, side-wheel steamship, captured: October 10, 1864
, screw steamer
Caroline, side-wheel steamer (also known as USS Arizona)
, schooner
, side-wheel steamer
 , paddle-steamer

, side-wheel steamer
 (also known as Constance), side-wheel steamer
, side-wheel steamer
, side-wheel steamer
Edith, steamer (Later CSS Chickamauga)
Ella, side-wheel steamer
Ella and Annie, side-wheel steamer (Captured April 1863)

, screw steamer
Etiwan, sloop
Eugenie, side-wheel steamer
Eugenie Smith, schooner
, side-wheel steamer
General Banks, paddle steamer (later Fanny and Jenny)
Gibraltar, screw steamer, bark-rigged
, side-wheel steamer
Lady Davis, steamer
, paddle-steamer
, side-wheel steamer
, side-wheel steamer
, screw steamer (later USS Memphis)
Monticello, Cuban blockade runner
, side-wheel steamer

Old Dominion, paddle steamer
, steamer
, schooner
, sloop
, side-wheel steamer
San Quintin, Cuban blockade runner
, schooner
Shark, schooner
, schooner
, (ex-Leopard), side-wheel steamer
, side-wheel steamer
Thistle, side-wheel steamer
Thomas L. Wragg, side-wheel steamer, brig-rigged (later, privateer Rattlesnake)
, side-wheel steamer
, schooner
, screw steamer
, steamer
, schooner

Foreign blockade runners
, screw steamer
, side-wheel steamer
, screw steamer
Denbigh side-wheel steamer, schooner rigged
Fingal, steamer
, screw steamer
Isabel steamer
, schooner
, sloop
Lark, side-wheel steamer
, screw steamer
Penquin, side-wheel steamer
, screw steamer
, screw steamer
Prince Albert, side-wheel steamer
, screw steamer
Thistle, screw steamer
, schooner
Victory, screw steamer
, paddle steamer
Wren, side-wheel steamer

CS Army

CSA cotton-clads

Used for river defense, CS Army cottonclads were typically more lightly armored and reinforced than a regular ironclad, such as the General Sterling Price, which was converted by placing a 4-inch oak sheath with a 1-inch iron covering on her bow, and by installing double pine bulkheads filled with compressed cotton bales. Many of the cottonclads were outfitted with rams.

River Defense Fleet cotton-clads:
, side-wheel steamer, cotton-clad ram, sunk: June 6, 1862
, steamer, cotton-clad ram, sunk: June 6, 1862
, steamer, cotton-clad ram, captured: June 6, 1862
, stern-wheel steamer, cotton-clad ram, burned: Apr, 1862
, side-wheel steamer, cotton-clad ram, burned: 1862
, steamer, cotton-clad ram, burned
, steamer, cotton-clad ram, sunk: June 6, 1862
, steamer, cotton-clad ram, sunk: June 6, 1862; raised into Union service
, steamer, cotton-clad ram, captured: June 6, 1862
, steamer, schooner rigged, cotton-clad ram, destroyed: April 24, 1862
, steamer, cotton-clad ram, captured: June 6, 1862
, side-wheel steamer, cotton-clad ram
, side-wheel steamer, cotton-clad ram, burned: April 24, 1862
, side-wheel steamer, cotton-clad ram, destroyed: April, 1862

Other CS Army cotton-clads:
, steamer, cotton-clad, burned: 1863
, steamer, cotton-clad, operated by Texas Marine Department
, river steamer, cotton-clad and ironclad ram, exploded: April 14, 1863
, steamer, cotton-clad, operated by Texas Marine Department
, river steamer, cotton-clad ram, transferred to CS Navy early 1865, burned: April, 1865

Other CSA Boats
CSA Bayou City, CS Army gunboat, side-wheel steamer
, CS Army transport, which was captured by the Union on August 10, 1862 while the transport was on the Savannah River in Georgia
CSA John Simonds, CS Army support ship, side-wheel steamer, sunk: April 7, 1862
, CS Army cargo steamer, captured: July 13, 1863
, CS Army transport, side-wheel steamer, surrendered: May 13, 1862
CSA Neptune, CS Army tugboat, sank: January 1, 1863

Other

Prizes
Alvarado - prize bark, captured: by privateer Jefferson Davis, July 21, 1861
Enchantress - prize schooner, captured: by privateer Jefferson Davis July 6, 1861

Undetermined
CSS Segar
CSS Smith
CSS W. R. Miles

See also
List of ironclads
Blockade runners of the American Civil War
Commerce raiding
Confederate privateer
Cotton-clad
Letters of marque
Ransom Bond
Bibliography of American Civil War naval history

References

Bibliography
Coski, John M. Capital Navy: The Men, Ships and Operations of the James River Squadron, Campbell, CA: Savas Woodbury Publishers, 1996, 
 
Gardiner Steam, Steel and Shellfire
Lambert A., Iron Hulls and Armour Plate
 
Scharf, J. Thomas. History of the Confederate States Navy: From its Organization to the Surrender of its Last Vessel. New York: Rogers and Sherwood, 1887; repr. The Fairfax Press, 1977.

External links
Photos of ships of the Confederate States Navy 

Confederate States Navy

Confederate Ships
Confederate Ships